Mosquito County (also labeled on maps as Musquito County) is the historic name of an early county that once comprised most of the eastern part of Florida. Its land included all of present-day Volusia, Brevard, Indian River, St. Lucie, Martin, Seminole, Osceola, Orange, Lake, Polk and Palm Beach counties.

Mosquito County went out of existence in 1844.

History 
The whole east coast of central Florida was known as "Los Musquitos" starting from the 1500s until 1844.

After Andrew Jackson received authority to take possession of the Florida territory ceded by Spain in 1821, he divided the whole territory into two counties, along the Suwannee River. All of the area west formed Escambia, and all of it east formed St. Johns County. This was largely consistent with the previously existing British colonies of West Florida and East Florida.

Mosquito County was split off from St. Johns on December 29, 1824, and the county seat was designated at John Bunch's house just west of the present location of Tomoka State Park.

In 1830, the census listed 15 heads of households, and a total of 733 persons, mostly slaves. In January 1835, the county seat was moved to New Smyrna. However, the Second Seminole War had largely depopulated Mosquito County of white settlers by the end of that year. In 1838, there was so little activity in the county that the St. Johns County Clerk was designated to keep the records of the county. However, by 1840, although the census listed no white inhabitants other than the military personnel based at Fort Pierce and New Smyrna, the county had its own officials.

In 1841, legislation was introduced and passed to rename the county "Leigh Read County". However the governor did not sign the bill within the legal time, so the renaming did not take place.

In 1842, the Armed Occupation Act was passed, providing a quarter section to any head of family who settled on property south of Ocala/Ormond.

In 1843, the county seat had moved again to Enterprise.

In 1844, the expansive area of Mosquito County was cut in half with the southern half being named St. Lucia County, and the northern half being renamed Orange County. St. Lucia County was renamed Brevard County in 1855.

See also 
 Spanish Florida
 East Florida
 Florida Territory
 Hernández–Capron Trail
 Charles Downing
 Douglas Dummett
 William Henry Brockenbrough
 Frederick Weedon

References

Further reading
  

Regions of the United States
1824 establishments in Florida Territory
1844 disestablishments in Florida Territory
Former counties of Florida
History of Florida
History of Brevard County, Florida
Osceola County, Florida
Orange County, Florida
Volusia County, Florida